Campiglia dei Foci is a village in Tuscany, central Italy, administratively a frazione of the comune of Colle di Val d'Elsa, province of Siena. At the time of the 2001 census its population was 873.

References 

Frazioni of Colle di Val d'Elsa